Gottlieb Scholtze (1713 – 6 April 1783) was a German pipe organ builder. He had his workshop in Neuruppin since 1740. He was a pupil of Joachim Wagner. Along with Ernst Julius Marx and Johann Wilhelm Grüneberg, he is considered the most important organ builder in the Mark Brandenburg in the second half of the 18th century. A total of 32 new buildings are recorded by him, including the organ of the parish church in Küstrin.

Organ Buildings (selection)

References

External links 
 
 Verein für die Restaurierung und Erhaltung der barocken Scholtze-Orgel der St.-Laurentiuskirche zu Havelberg e.V.

German pipe organ builders
1713 births
1783 deaths
Place of birth missing